The Illinois–Purdue football rivalry is an American college football rivalry between the Illinois Fighting Illini football team of the University of Illinois and Purdue Boilermakers football team of Purdue University. The Purdue Cannon is presented to the winner of the game. Purdue leads the series 47–45–6.

History
It all started in 1905 when a group of Purdue students took the Cannon to Champaign in anticipation of firing it to celebrate a Boilermaker victory. Although Purdue won 29–0, Illinois supporters, including Quincy A. Hall, discovered it in a culvert by the field and took it before the Purdue students could start their "booming" celebration.

Hall later moved it to his farmhouse near Milford, Illinois, where it survived a fire and gathered dust until he suggested it be used as a trophy in the football series between the two schools when the rivalry resumed in 1943 after an 11-year lapse. It was presented at halftime to the schools' athletic directors, Doug Mills and Guy Mackey. Before the Cannon became an annual tradition, Illinois led the series 15–8–2.

The cannon is now maintained by the Tomahawk Service and Leadership Honorary at Purdue and Illini Pride.

Game results

See also  
 List of NCAA college football rivalry games

References

College football rivalries in the United States
Illinois Fighting Illini football
Purdue Boilermakers football
Big Ten Conference rivalries